Santa Justa Lift,  lift in the city of Lisbon
 Santa Justa, Portuguese parish in Lisbon
 Santa Justa, Portuguese parish in Arraiolos
 Santa Justa Klan, Spanish music band
 Santa Justa, railway station in Seville
 Saints Justa and Rufina (Spanish: Santa Justa y Santa Rufina)